Bradgate Park and Cropston Reservoir is a  geological Site of Special Scientific Interest north–west of Leicester. It is also a Nature Conservation Review site, and Bradgate Park contains Geological Conservation Review sites and a Scheduled Monument.

Bradgate Park has one of the best examples of ancient parkland in the county, and Cropston Reservoir has unusual plants on its shores. The park has Charnian rocks dating to the Ediacaran period around 600 million years ago, and it has provided the type section for four different members of the stratigraphic sequence. It is described by Natural England as "a site of great importance to the study of Precambrian palaeontology".

There are footpaths through the park and around the reservoir.

References

Sites of Special Scientific Interest in Leicestershire
Geological Conservation Review sites
Nature Conservation Review sites